The Academy of Science, St. Louis (sometimes rendered as Academy of Science - St. Louis) is a non-profit organization in St. Louis, Missouri, dedicated to science literacy and education. Founded in 1856 by a group of scientists and businessmen, including George Engelmann and James B. Eads, the Academy has been involved in many science-related activities in the city.

The Academy was long known for its study collections, library, and museums—most notably the Museum of Science and Natural History in Clayton, Missouri, which operated from 1959 until about 1990. The organization gave its books to local college libraries, while some of its study collections were absorbed by the St. Louis Science Center, which the Academy helped to raise funds for.

Today, the Academy works to expand scientific outreach, education, resource sharing, and the recognition of scientific accomplishment.

History

Early years 
In the 1830s, a Western Academy of Natural Sciences in St. Louis was founded as a counterpart to the Eastern Academy of Natural Sciences. It aimed to explore the West and discover natural resources.

In 1856, the Academy was reorganized into the Academy of Science of St. Louis by 15 founding members, including a dozen physicians, a lawyer, an engineer and a businessman. The new Academy held its first meeting on March 10, 1856, and pledged to advance science in what was then the rapidly growing city of St. Louis. More specifically, the Academy's mission was to promote "Zoology, Botany, Geology, Mineralogy, Paleontology, Ethnology, Chemistry, Physics, Mathematics, Meteorology, Comparative Anatomy, and Physiology."

Founders

 Dr. George Engelmann, a physician and the Academy's first president and a prominent amateur botanist, helped plan the renowned Missouri Botanical Garden. 
 Frederick Adolphus Wislezenus, a doctor and an accomplished observer of Western natural history, helped found the Missouri Historical Society. 
 Karl Andreas Geyer, a naturalist, was also a strong influence on the organization. 
 James B. Eads, a self-taught engineer, who built the Eads Bridge over the Mississippi River; 
 Attorney Nathaniel Holmes, who acquired numerous publications from other science societies for the Academy;  
 Charles P. Chouteau, owner of the American Fur Trading Co., who studied the region's natural history and contributed to the museum's collections.
 Benjamin Shumard, who assisted in Missouri's first exhaustive geological survey; Simon Pollak, who helped found the Missouri School for the Blind;
 Moses Linton, a St. Louis University Medical School teacher, who first published the St. Louis Medical and Surgical Journal; 
 William M. McPheeters (1815-1905), a St. Louis Medical College and Missouri Medical College teacher; 
 Moses M. Pallen, a St. Louis University teacher who served as St. Louis' health officer; 
 Charles A. Pope, a St. Louis Medical College Dean, who allowed Academy members to meet and house their collections and library in one of the college's buildings; 
 Hiram A. Prout, who came to teach medicine and became an expert paleontologist; 
 Charles W. Stevens, a St. Louis Medical College teacher, who became superintendent of the St. Louis County Insane Asylum; 
 W. H. Tingley, a physician;  
 John H. Watters, a St. Louis Medical College and Missouri Medical College teacher.

First century (1856-1956)
Academy members started a museum collection, maintained a library, published a journal, and corresponded with leading scientists of the day, providing information concerning the lands that lay adjacent and to the west of St. Louis.

Early members of the Academy collected natural history specimens for their society. These items were stored and made available to the public in various museums throughout the Academy's history.  Choteau and Wislizenus accumulated botanical, zoological and geological specimens from the vast and little-known regions of the American West. In later years, collectors such as Henry M. Whelpey (Native American artifacts) and Stratford Lee Morton (minerals, sea shells and fossils) donated their collections to the Academy. 

For many years, the Academy published one of the world's most respected scientific journals, Transactions of the Academy of Science of St. Louis. Scientific societies of the eastern United States and in Europe were eager to receive copies of Transactions, which contained papers on the natural history and geology of the American West. Outstanding scientist and Academy member African-American Charles Henry Turner, a devoted entomologist, published over 50 papers on subjects in neurology, invertebrate ecology and animal behavior in the Academy's world-renowned Transactions.

Second century (1956-) 
In 1958, the Academy sold its building at 4642 Lindell Boulevard, leaving the organization temporarily homeless. That same year, Murl Deusing, curator of education at the Milwaukee Public Museum, was hired to become the Academy's director at an annual salary of $12,000 a year ($ today). His offices were to be in the academy's planned museum in Oak Knoll Park in Clayton, Missouri.

This was to be the fourth Academy museum: the St. Louis Museum of Science and Natural History. It was partially funded through a $50,000 gift from J. Lionberger Davis, a St. Louis lawyer and banker who had previously given objects worth "hundreds of thousands of dollars" to the Saint Louis Art Museum. The donation to the Academy helped the organization qualify for a $45,000 grant from the trust fund of one A. P. Greensfelder, whose grant specified that it be disbursed only after the Academy raised another $135,000. Academy president Stratford Lee Morton said at the time that he hoped to raise a total of $500,000 for the academy's proposed museum of science and industry and museum of Ozark-area natural history.

In 1959, the academy installed part of its collections in two stone mansions in the park and opened the museum. The academy paid just $1 per year in rent, but was responsible for upkeep on the buildings. The museum, which was free to enter, was immediately popular with the public. Its informal science classes drew thousands of children, while exhibits such as an Egyptian mummy and an adult gorilla skeleton attracted adults as well. Its study collections included local rocks and minerals; fossil mollusks; archeological items; herpetology; and antique lamps, lighting equipment, and radios. Archival holdings at the museum included two linear feet of meeting minutes and other Academy documents from 1856 to 1941.

But within a few years, the academy was struggling to fund its maintenance. Similar funding problems with the Saint Louis Zoo and the Saint Louis Art Museum led city leaders in 1969 to propose a tax levy to support all three institutions. When voters approved the levy in 1971, control of the museum and its collection passed to a Board of Commissioners. The museum was eventually closed and part of the collection was transferred to the new Saint Louis Science Center.  In the late 1980s, the Academy helped lead the campaign to build the new science center, which opened in 1992.

Throughout its history, the Academy has promoted important scientific work and continues to be a staunch supporter of mathematics and science education. Academy-sponsored lectures, exhibits and television productions have been an important part of the St. Louis area's educational scene.

The Academy promotes science and increasing science literacy among students and the general public. More than 600 professional scientists have volunteered through the Academy to speak at elementary and secondary schools, universities, civic and youth organizations and other community groups.  Many also serve as mentors for the over 450 students who are members of the Junior Academy of Science of St. Louis, for students in the sixth through twelfth grades in the St. Louis Area.

References

External links

Academy of Science of St. Louis: Meeting Minutes Finding Aid at the St. Louis Public Library

Education in St. Louis
Academies of sciences
1856 establishments in Missouri
Scientific organizations established in 1856
Science and technology in Missouri